683 Lanzia is a minor planet orbiting the Sun. It was discovered July 23, 1909, by Max Wolf at the Landessternwarte Heidelberg-Königstuhl observatory and was named in honor of Lanz, founder of the Heidelberg Academy of Sciences. Photometric observations made in 2003 at the Santana Observatory in Rancho Cucamonga, California, give a synodic rotation period of 8.63 ± 0.005 hours. The light curve shows a brightness variation of 0.15 ± 0.04 in magnitude.

Observations during two last occultation 18 and 22 December 2010 (P.Baruffetti, G. Tonlorenzi - Massa, G. Bonatti - Carrara, R. Di Luca - Bologna (Italy), C. Schnabel - S. Estebe, J. Rovira - Moja (Spain)) measured a 122.5 km diameter (medium) and an Albedo of 0.0705 compatible with carbonaceous asteroids (C group).

References

External links 
 
 

000683
Discoveries by Max Wolf
Named minor planets
19090723